The Old Yemenite Synagogue, known to its congregation as Beit Knesset Ohel Shlomo (lit. "Solomon's Tent Synagogue"), is a restored synagogue from the nineteenth century Yemenite Village (Harat al-Yaman in Arabic), the Kfar Hashiloach neighborhood in the Jerusalem district of Silwan.

History

Jewish community in Silwan (1884-1938)
Between 1885 and 1891, 45 stone houses were built for the Yemenite Jews which had arrived in Jerusalem in 1882
In 1936, during the 1936–39 Arab revolt in Palestine, the Yemenite-Jewish community was removed from Silwan by the Welfare Bureau of the Jerusalem Community Council (Va'ad ha-Kehillah), the local counterpart of the Jewish National Council (Va'ad Leumi), into the Jewish Quarter as security conditions for Jews worsened. and in 1938, the remaining Yemenite Jews in Silwan were evacuated by the Jewish Community Council on the advice of the police.

According to documents in the custodian office and real estate and project advancement expert Edmund Levy, the buildings of the Yemenite Jews were occupied by Arab families without registering ownership.

Jewish reclaim (2015)
In May, 2015 Ateret Cohanim, a Jewish group that had established legal ownership of the old synagogue, moved into the building. Local residents threw rocks at the activists as they moved in.

References

Synagogues in Jerusalem
Synagogues completed in 1890
Yemeni-Jewish culture in Israel